José Augusto Geraldino (born 6 February 1971) is a Dominican Republic judoka. He competed at the 1996 Summer Olympics and the 2000 Summer Olympics.

References

External links
 

1971 births
Living people
Dominican Republic male judoka
Olympic judoka of the Dominican Republic
Judoka at the 1996 Summer Olympics
Judoka at the 2000 Summer Olympics
Place of birth missing (living people)